In computer programming, scope is an enclosing context where values and expressions are associated.  The scope resolution operator helps to identify and specify the context to which an identifier refers, particularly by specifying a namespace. The specific uses vary across different programming languages with the notions of scoping. In many languages, the scope resolution operator is written ::.

In some languages, notably those influenced by Modula-3 (including Python and Go), modules are objects, and scope resolution within modules is a special case of usual object member access, so the usual method operator . is used for scope resolution. Other languages, notably C++ and Ruby, feature both scope resolution and method access, which interact in various ways; see examples below.

C++ 
class A {
public:
    static int i; // scope of A
};

namespace B {
    int c = 2;
} // namespace B

int A::i = 4; // scope operator refers to the integer i declared in the class A
int x = B::c; // scope operator refers to the integer c declared in the namespace B

PHP 
In PHP, the scope resolution operator is also called Paamayim Nekudotayim (the second word a colloquial corruption of נקודתיים), which means “double colon” in Hebrew.

The name "Paamayim Nekudotayim" was introduced in the Israeli-developed Zend Engine 0.5 used in PHP 3. Although it has been confusing to many developers who do not speak Hebrew, it is still being used in PHP 7, as in this sample error message:
$ php -r ::
Parse error: syntax error, unexpected T_PAAMAYIM_NEKUDOTAYIM
A similar error can also occur where no scope resolution operator is present. For example, attempting to check whether a constant is empty() triggers this error:
$ php -r 'define("foo", "bar"); if (empty(foo)) echo "empty";'
Parse error: syntax error, unexpected ')', expecting T_PAAMAYIM_NEKUDOTAYIM
As of PHP 5.4, error messages concerning the scope resolution operator still include this name, but have clarified its meaning somewhat:
$ php -r ::
Parse error:  syntax error, unexpected '::' (T_PAAMAYIM_NEKUDOTAYIM)
There are other less obvious ways to trigger the error, for example by attempting to use the following invalid PHP expression:
$ php -r static const '$a=1'
Parse error:  syntax error, unexpected end of file, expecting :: (T_PAAMAYIM_NEKUDOTAYIM)

Ruby 
In Ruby, scope resolution can be specified using the module keyword.
module Example
  Version = 1.0

  class << self # We are accessing the module's singleton class
    def hello(who = "world")
      "Hello #{who}"
    end
  end
end #/Example

Example::hello # => "Hello world"
Example.hello "hacker" # => "Hello hacker"

Example::Version # => 1.0
Example.Version # NoMethodError

# This illustrates the difference between the message (.) operator and the scope operator in Ruby
# We can use both ::hello and .hello, because hello is a part of Example's scope and because Example
# responds to the message hello.
#
# We can't do the same with ::Version and .Version, because Version is within the scope of Example, but
# Example can't respond to the message Version, since there is no method to respond with.

Scope is also affected by sigils which preface variable names:
 "$" - global variable
 "@" - instance variable of self
 "@@" - class variable
 No sigil, lowercase or underscore - local variable or method
 No sigil, uppercase - constant

References

External links 
 Bjarne Stroustrup's C++ Glossary

Operators (programming)
PHP software
Articles with example C++ code
Articles with example Ruby code
Articles with example PHP code